James Telfer (born 17 March 1940) is a Scottish former rugby union coach and player. As a player, he won 21 international caps in the amateur era, also having a career as a headmaster at Hawick High School and Galashiels Academy and Forrester High School as a chemistry teacher. With Sir Ian McGeechan he had success with both the Scotland national team and the British Lions.

Playing career
Telfer played for Melrose RFC and was still a student when he was first selected for international duties. He later worked as a chemistry teacher. His first cap came against France at Murrayfield on 4 January 1964. His last match for Scotland was on 28 February 1970 at Lansdowne Road against Ireland.

Telfer gained twenty one caps for Scotland, and, but for injury, might have gained more. Allan Massie wrote of him:

"Telfer is a man of innate authority. (There's a wealth of quiet reserve and self-knowledge, touched by that form of self-mockery which appears as under-statement, in the way he will describe himself as being a 'dominant personality')"

Telfer played back row for Scotland and for the British Lions in 1966 and 1968. He was impressed and heavily influenced by New Zealand rugby. After a cartilage operation he slowed up. He played 23 games for the British Lions on their 1966 tour to Australia and New Zealand and 11 games on their 1968 tour to South Africa.

Between 1963 and 1967, he played 8 times for the Barbarians, scoring six points.

George Crerar said of him "The great thing about Jim Telfer is that he makes sure that if he isn't going to win the ball the other side won't get it either."

Coaching career
Telfer was head coach to the British Lions on their tour of New Zealand in 1983. He was assistant coach, with particular responsibility for the forwards, on the 1997 British Lions tour to South Africa, where he made his well-known motivational 'Everest' speech to the forwards before the 1st Test.

Telfer coached Scotland to the Grand Slam in 1984 and, as assistant to Ian McGeechan, to his second Grand Slam in 1990. In his third term as head coach from 1998 to 1999, Scotland won the final Five Nations Championship.

In 2014 he was coaching the Melrose RFC Under-18 team – Melrose Wasps.

Telfer has been open about copying some New Zealand approaches to the game.

 Coaching statistics 
 Scotland (1981–1984) 
 International matches as head coach 

 Record by country 

 Scotland (1993–1995, 1998–1999) 

The period 1995–98 saw Telfer promoted as director of rugby for the Scottish Rugby Union. Richie Dixon was the head coach of the Scotland National team during this time. Telfer stepped in as head coach of Scotland when Dixon quit in 1998.

 International matches as head coach 

 Record by country 

 Honours 
In 2021, World Rugby inducted Telfer into its World Rugby Hall of Fame, alongside Osea Kolinisau, Humphrey Kayange, Huriana Manuel, Cheryl McAfee and Will Carling.

 As a player 
 
 Five Nations Championship
 Winner: 1964
 Runner-up: 1966, 1967
 Calcutta Cup
 Winner: 1964, 1965, 1966

 As a coach 

  
 Five Nations Championship
 Winner: 1984, 1999
 Grand Slam: 1984
 Runner-up: 1981, 1982, 1995
 Triple Crown
 Winner: 1984
 Calcutta Cup
 Winner: 1983, 1984
 Centenary Quaich
 Winner: 1994, 1995, 1998, 1999

  (as assistant coach)
 Five/Six Nations Championship
 Winner: 1990
 Grand Slam: 1990
 Runner-up: 1989, 1992, 1993
 Triple Crown
 Winner: 1990
 Calcutta Cup
 Winner: 1989, 1990, 2000
 Centenary Quaich
 Winner: 1989, 1990, 1991, 1992, 1993, 2001

References

Sources
 Bath, Richard (ed.) The Complete Book of Rugby (Seven Oaks Ltd, 1997 )
 Massie, Allan A Portrait of Scottish Rugby (Polygon, Edinburgh)
 Telfer, Jim Jim Telfer: Looking Back... For Once'' (Mainstream Publishing, 2005)

External links
 Jim Telfer (The Scotsman)
 

1940 births
Living people
Alumni of the University of Edinburgh
British & Irish Lions coaches
British & Irish Lions rugby union players from Scotland
Melrose RFC players
Provinces District (rugby union) players
Rugby union players from Melrose, Scottish Borders
Scotland international rugby union players
Scotland national rugby union team coaches
Scottish rugby union coaches
Scottish rugby union players
Scottish schoolteachers
South of Scotland District (rugby union) players
Rugby union number eights